The 2014–2015 UCI Cyclo-cross World Cup events and season-long competition took place between 10 October 2014 and 26 January 2014, organised by the Union Cycliste Internationale (UCI).

The men's competition took place without the Belgian Niels Albert, twice the winner, who announced his retirement from the sport in May, 2014 because of a heart condition.

Katie Compton of the United States had dominated the women's competition last year and was attempting to defend her title.

The third round held in Milton Keynes, England was notable for being the first time that a World Cup event had been held outside of mainland Europe.

Events
In comparison to last season's seven races, this season only had six. Rome, Nommay and Tábor were taken out of the programme – the latter ultimately hosting the World Championships – while Milton Keynes was added and Hoogerheide is back after hosting the 2014 World Championships .

Individual standings

Men

Women

References

World Cup
World Cup
UCI Cyclo-cross World Cup